Abasolo is a city located in the Mexican state of Tamaulipas. It is the seat of Abasolo Municipality.

Climate

References

External links 
 Gobierno Municipal de Abasolo Official website

Populated places in Tamaulipas